A bashi-bazouk was an irregular soldier of the Ottoman army.

Bashi-bazouk may also refer to:

Bashi-Bazouk (Jean-Léon Gérôme), an 1869 painting
"Bashi-Bazouk", a song by Peter Gabriel from the single "Digging in the Dirt"